is a Japanese footballer.

Club statistics
.

Notes

References

External links

2001 births
Living people
Sportspeople from Osaka Prefecture
Association football people from Osaka Prefecture
Kansai University alumni
Japanese footballers
Association football midfielders
J3 League players
Gamba Osaka players
Gamba Osaka U-23 players